The 2016 CAF Confederation Cup qualifying rounds were played from 12 February to 18 May 2016. A total of 59 teams competed in the qualifying rounds to decide the eight places in the group stage of the 2016 CAF Confederation Cup.

Draw

The draw for the preliminary, first and second rounds was held on 11 December 2015 in Dakar, Senegal.

The entry round of the 55 teams entered into the draw was determined by their performances in the CAF competitions for the previous five seasons (CAF 5-Year Ranking points shown in parentheses).

Format

In the qualifying rounds, each tie was played on a home-and-away two-legged basis. If the aggregate score was tied after the second leg, the away goals rule would be applied, and if still tied, extra time would not be played, and the penalty shoot-out would be used to determine the winner (Regulations III. 13 & 14).

Schedule
The schedule of each round was as follows.

Bracket

The eight winners of the second round advanced to the play-off round, where they were joined by the eight losers of the Champions League second round.

Preliminary round
The preliminary round included the 38 teams that did not receive byes to the first round.

|}

1–1 on aggregate. Vita Club Mokanda won 6–5 on penalties.

Police won 4–3 on aggregate.

Sagrada Esperança won 3–2 on aggregate.

MC Oran won on walkover after Wallidan withdrew.

SC Gagnoa won 2–0 on aggregate.

3–3 on aggregate. Kawkab Marrakech won 5–4 on penalties.

Bidvest Wits won 9–0 on aggregate.

Renaissance won 3–2 on aggregate.

Harare City won 6–3 on aggregate.

2–2 on aggregate. Stade Gabèsien won 4–3 on penalties.

Nasarawa United won 2–1 on aggregate.

Misr Lel Makkasa won 6–1 on aggregate.

FC Saint-Éloi Lupopo won 3–1 on aggregate.

Al-Ittihad Tripoli won 5–4 on aggregate.

0–0 on aggregate. Deportivo Mongomo won 4–2 on penalties.The CAF announced on 2 March 2016 that UMS de Loum won on walkover after Deportivo Mongomo were disqualified for fielding an ineligible player.

SC Villa won 2–0 on aggregate.

JKU won on walkover after Gaborone United withdrew.

Atlético Olympic won 2–1 on aggregate.

Africa Sports won 4–2 on aggregate.

First round
The first round included 32 teams: the 19 winners of the preliminary round, and the 13 teams that received byes to this round.

|}

Vita Club Mokanda won 1–0 on aggregate.

Sagrada Esperança won 2–1 on aggregate.

MC Oran won 4–2 on aggregate.

Kawkab Marrakech won 3–2 on aggregate.

Azam won 7–3 on aggregate.

Espérance de Tunis won 7–0 on aggregate.

Zanaco won 5–2 on aggregate.

Stade Gabèsien won 2–1 on aggregate.

CS Constantine won 4–2 on aggregate.

Misr Lel Makkasa won 3–2 on aggregate.

2–2 on aggregate. Al-Ahly Shendi won on away goals.

Medeama won 2–1 on aggregate.

FUS Rabat won 3–2 on aggregate.

SC Villa won 5–0 on aggregate.

CF Mounana won 5–0 on aggregate.

ENPPI won 6–1 on aggregate.

Second round
The second round included the 16 winners of the first round.

|}

Sagrada Esperança won 4–1 on aggregate.

Kawkab Marrakech won 1–0 on aggregate.

Espérance de Tunis won 4–2 on aggregate.

Stade Gabèsien won 4–1 on aggregate.

Misr Lel Makkasa won 3–2 on aggregate.

Medeama won 2–0 on aggregate.

FUS Rabat won 7–1 on aggregate.

2–2 on aggregate. CF Mounana won 5–4 on penalties.

Play-off round
The play-off round included 16 teams: the eight winners of the Confederation Cup second round and the eight losers of the Champions League second round.

The draw for the play-off round was held on 21 April 2016, 14:00 EET (UTC+2), at the CAF Headquarters in Cairo, Egypt. The winners of the Confederation Cup second round were drawn against the losers of the Champions League second round, with the former hosting the second leg.The 16 teams were seeded by their performances in the CAF competitions for the previous five seasons (CAF 5-Year Ranking points shown in parentheses):
Pot A contained the two highest-ranked winners of the Confederation Cup second round.
Pot B contained the six lowest-ranked losers of the Champions League second round.
Pot C contained the two highest-ranked losers of the Champions League second round.
Pot D contained the six lowest-ranked losers of the Confederation Cup second round.

First, a team from Pot A and a team from Pot B were drawn into two ties. Next, a team from Pot C and a team from Pot D were drawn into two ties. Finally, the remaining teams from Pot B and Pot D were drawn into the last four ties.
The eight winners of the play-off round advanced to the group stage.

|}

1–1 on aggregate. MO Béjaïa won on away goals.

FUS Rabat won 4–0 on aggregate.

Étoile du Sahel won 2–1 on aggregate.

2–2 on aggregate. TP Mazembe won on away goals.

1–1 on aggregate. Al-Ahli Tripoli won on away goals.

Kawkab Marrakech won 2–1 on aggregate.

Young Africans won 2–1 on aggregate.

3–3 on aggregate. Medeama won on away goals.The CAF announced on 24 May 2016 that Mamelodi Sundowns won their Champions League second round tie on walkover after AS Vita Club were disqualified for fielding an ineligible player in their preliminary round tie against Mafunzo. Mamelodi Sundowns played in the Confederation Cup play-off round before they were reinstated to the Champions League.

Notes

References

External links
Orange CAF Confederation Cup 2016, CAFonline.com

1